The 2005 World Junior Ice Hockey Championships (2005 WJC) was held between December 25, 2004, and January 4, 2005, at the Ralph Engelstad Arena in Grand Forks, North Dakota, and at the Ralph Engelstad Arena in Thief River Falls, Minnesota, United States. Canada won the gold medal. Jim Johannson oversaw administration of the event on behalf of USA Hockey.

Venues

Rosters

Top Division

Preliminary round

Group A

Group B

Relegation round

Note: Matches  5–0  and  5–0  from the preliminary round are included as well since these results carry forward.

Final round

Bracket

Quarterfinals

Semifinals

Fifth place game

Bronze medal game

Gold medal game

Scoring leaders
GP = Games played; G = Goals; A = Assists; Pts = Points; +/− = Plus-minus; PIM = Penalties In MinutesSource: IIHF.com

Goaltending leaders
(minimum 40% team's total ice time)

TOI = Time on ice (minutes:seconds); GA = Goals against; GAA = Goals against average; Sv% = Save percentage; SO = Shutouts
Source: IIHF.com

Awards

All-Star Team
Goaltender:
 Marek Schwarz

Defense:
 Dion Phaneuf,
 Ryan Suter

Forwards:
 Alexander Ovechkin,
 Patrice Bergeron,
 Jeff Carter

Most Valuable Player
 Patrice Bergeron

Final standings

Division I
The Division I Championships were played on December 13–19, 2004 in Sheffield, United Kingdom (Group A), and Narva, Estonia (Group B).

Group A

Leading scorer: Mathis Olimb, Norway (4 goals, 5 assists; 9 points).

Group B

Leading scorer: Anže Kopitar, Slovenia (10 goals, 3 assists; 13 points).

Division II
The Division II Championships were played on January 3–9, 2005 in Bucharest, Romania (Group A), and on December 13–19, 2004 in Puigcerdà, Spain (Group B).

Group A

Group B

Leading scorer: Park Woo-Sang,  (12 goals, 8 assists; 20 points).

Division III
The Division III Championship was played on January 10–16, 2005 in Mexico City, Mexico.

References

External links
 Team Canada

 
World Junior Ice Hockey Championships
Sports in Grand Forks, North Dakota
World
2005
World Junior Ice Hockey Championships
World Junior Ice Hockey Championships
World Junior Ice Hockey Championship
World Junior Ice Hockey Championship
Ice hockey competitions in North Dakota
Ice hockey competitions in Minnesota
Sports in Thief River Falls, Minnesota
International ice hockey competitions hosted by the United Kingdom
International ice hockey competitions hosted by Estonia
Sport in Narva
World Junior Championship
World Junior Championship
Sports competitions in Sheffield
World Junior Ice Hockey Championships, 2005
World Junior Championship
World Junior Championship
International ice hockey competitions hosted by Romania
International ice hockey competitions hosted by Spain
International ice hockey competitions hosted by Mexico
World Junior Championship
Sports competitions in Mexico City
World Junior Ice Hockey Championships, 2005
Sports competitions in Bucharest
2000s in Bucharest
Sports competitions in Catalonia
World Junior Ice Hockey Championship
World Junior Ice Hockey Championship